Ginella Zerbo (born 5 May 1997) is a Dutch field hockey player.
Zerbo scored the winning goal in the semi-final of the 2015 European Championship.

References

External links 
 
 

1997 births
Living people
Dutch female field hockey players
People from Uithoorn 
Field hockey players at the 2014 Summer Youth Olympics
Sportspeople from North Holland